Cocentaina is a locality and municipality in the comarca of Comtat, in the province of Alicante, Spain. The village is located between the mountainous Serra de Mariola national park and the Serpis river. Cocentaina is ideally situated for both road and mountain biking. Many of the roads are used for training by professional teams (Astana have been seen regularly), and several roads have been used by the Vuelta a España.

The economy of Cocentaina is chiefly based on the textile industry.

Main sights
The most important monuments in Cocentaina are the convents of the orders of Saint Clare (from the 16th century) and Saint Francis, the Catholic church of L'Assumpció and the Palace of the Counts of Cocentaina.
 Palace of the Counts of Cocentaina
 Cocentaina Castle
 Route of the Valencian classics
 Serra Mariola Natural Park

Events
The Moros i cristians festival and the Fira de Tots Sants ("All Saints Fair") of Cocentaina attracts many tourists each year. The Moros i Cristians festival is dated in 1586.

People
 David Belda, cyclist
 Nicolás Borrás, a Spanish Renaissance painter and monk of the Monastery of Sant Jeroni de Cotalba.
 Timoteo Briet Montaud, art nouveau architech.
 Natxo Insa, footballer
 José Luis Moltó, Spanish volleyball player
 Lucas Torró, footballer
 Rafael Valls, cyclist

References

External links 

 Ajuntament de Cocentaina, Municipal government of Cocentaina 
 L'Escaleta Restaurant,  Michelin star (*) 

Comtat
Municipalities in the Province of Alicante